11 Cephei is a single star in the northern constellation of Cepheus, located 184 light years away from the Sun. It is visible to the naked eye as a faint, orange-hued star with an apparent visual magnitude of 4.55. The star has a relatively high proper motion, traversing the celestial sphere at the rate of 0.153 arc seconds per annum. It is moving closer to the Earth with a heliocentric radial velocity of −38 km/s.

This is an aging giant star with a stellar classification of K0.5 III, having exhausted the hydrogen at its core and expanded. It is a red clump giant, which means it is currently on the horizontal branch and is generating energy through helium fusion at the core. 11 Cephei is 670 million years old with 2.4 times the mass of the Sun and 11 times the Sun's radius. It is radiating around 95 times the luminosity of the Sun from its swollen photosphere at an effective temperature of 5,446 K.

References

K-type giants
Horizontal-branch stars
Cepheus (constellation)
Durchmusterung objects
Cephei, 11
206952
107119
8317